Phetchaburi station may refer to:

Phetchaburi MRT station, an underground rapid transit station in Bangkok
Phetchaburi railway station, the main railway station of Phetchaburi